Graceland is the former estate of Elvis Presley.

Graceland may also refer to:

Places
 Graceland (Elkins, West Virginia), a historic house
 Graceland Cemetery (Washington, D.C.)
 Graceland Cemetery in Chicago, Illinois

Arts, entertainment, and media
 Graceland (album), 1986 by Paul Simon
"Graceland" (song), the title track
 Graceland (Kierra Sheard album), 2014
Graceland (film), a 2012 Filipino drama
 Graceland (TV series), a 2013 American drama
 GraceLand, a 2004 novel by Chris Abani
 Graceland (Roberts novel), 2019, by Bethan Roberts

Other uses
 Graceland University, a private liberal arts university in Lamoni, Iowa, and Independence, Missouri